Moriah Harbour Cay National Park is a national park in Exuma, the Bahamas.

Flora and fauna
On land, the park provides nesting sites for gull-billed and least terns, nighthawks, oystercatchers, plovers, and a resident pair of ospreys. Plants found at the park include buttonwoods, bay cedar, palmettos and sea oats. The park's mangroves provide a nursery for crabs, crawfish, conch, mangrove snappers, yellowtails and groupers.

References

National parks of the Bahamas
Exuma